Conacmella vagans is a species of minute, salt marsh snails with an operculum, aquatic gastropod mollusks, or micromollusks, in the family Assimineidae. This species is endemic to Japan.

References

Molluscs of Japan
Assimineidae
Gastropods described in 1907
Taxonomy articles created by Polbot